The Golden Globe Award for Best Documentary Film is a Golden Globe Award that was introduced for the 11th Golden Globe Awards, followed by the 30th Golden Globe Awards before discontinuation after the 34th Golden Globe Awards. The award was first given to A Queen is Crowned (1953), which details the Coronation of Queen Elizabeth II. It was last given to Altars of the World (1976).

Winners and nominees

1953
A Queen is Crowned

1972
Elvis on Tour
Walls of Fire 
Marjoe 
Russia
Sapporo Orinpikku (Sapporo Winter Olympics)

1973
Visions of Eight
Love
The Movies That Made Us
The Second Gun
Wattstax

1974
Animals Are Beautiful People
Birds Do It, Bees Do It 
Hearts and Minds 
I Am a Dancer
Janis

1975
Youthquake!
Brother Can You Spare a Dime?
The Gentleman Tramp
Mustang: The House That Joe Built
The Other Half of the Sky: A China Memoir 
UFOs: Past, Present, and Future

1976
Altars of the World
People of the Wind 
The Memory of Justice
Wings of an Eagle
That's Entertainment, Part II

See also
Academy Award for Best Documentary Feature

References

External links
 30th Golden Globe Awards
 31st Golden Globe Awards
 32nd Golden Globe Awards
 33rd Golden Globe Awards
 34th Golden Globe Awards

Documentary Film
American documentary film awards
Awards established in 1953